Tuba Yenen Yakan (born Yenen on January 8, 1991) is a European champion Turkish female karateka competing in the kumite 55 kg division. She is a member of Kocaeli BB Kağıt SK.

Born Tuba Yenen on January 8, 1991, she is married to national karateka Mehmet Yakan.

Achievements
2015
  European Championships – 23 March, Istanbul, TUR – kumite 55 kg,

2017
  European Championships – 6 May, İzmit, TUR – kumite 55 kg,

References

Living people
1991 births
Turkish female karateka
Kocaeli Büyükşehir Belediyesi Kağıt Spor athletes
Kocaeli University alumni
European champions for Turkey
Competitors at the 2013 Mediterranean Games
Competitors at the 2018 Mediterranean Games
Competitors at the 2022 Mediterranean Games
Mediterranean Games medalists in karate
Mediterranean Games gold medalists for Turkey
Mediterranean Games bronze medalists for Turkey
European Games competitors for Turkey
Karateka at the 2015 European Games
Karateka at the 2019 European Games
Islamic Solidarity Games medalists in karate
Islamic Solidarity Games competitors for Turkey
21st-century Turkish women